Open Geosciences is a peer-reviewed open-access scientific journal covering all aspects of the Earth sciences. It is published by De Gruyter and the editor-in-chief is Piotr Jankowski (San Diego State University). The journal was established in 2009 as the Central European Journal of Geosciences, co-published by Versita and Springer Science+Business Media. In 2014, the journal was moved to De Gruyter. It obtained its current name in 2015, when it became open-access.

Abstracting and indexing 
The journals is abstracted and indexed by the following services:

Scopus
Solid States and Superconductivity Abstracts
GeoRef
Google Scholar
SCImago Journal Rank
WorldCat
ReadCube
Astrophysics Data System
Index Copernicus
Directory of Open Access Journals (DOAJ)
Current Contents - Clarivate Analytics (formerly Thomson Reuters)
Journal Citation Reports - Clarivate Analytics (formerly Thomson Reuters)
Science Citation Index Expanded (SCI) - Clarivate Analytics (formerly Thomson Reuters)

According to Journal Citation Reports, the journal has a 2018 impact factor of 0.788.

References

External links 
 

Earth and atmospheric sciences journals
Continuous journals
Geography journals
Publications established in 2009
English-language journals
De Gruyter academic journals
Creative Commons Attribution-licensed journals